The 390th Strategic Missile Wing was an intercontinental ballistic missile organization of the United States Air Force. Part of Strategic Air Command, it was stationed at Davis–Monthan Air Force Base, Arizona. 

The wing was first organized as the 390th Bombardment Group in January 1943 and equipped with the Boeing B-17 Flying Fortress.  After training in the United States, the group moved to England, beginning combat operations in August. The group flew 300 combat missions and was twice awarded the Distinguished Unit Citation for its action in combat. Its last mission was on 20 April 1945.  After V-E Day, the group returned to the United States, where it was inactivated in August 1945.

The 390th Strategic Missile Wing was organized in January 1962 as the United States Air Force's first LGM-25C Titan II wing, becoming operational in March 1963.  It earned honors as the best Titan II wing in Strategic Air Command (SAC) on five occasions, and in 1979 earned the Blanchard Trophy as SAC's best missile wing of any kind.  It was inactivated in 1984 with the retirement of the Titan II from the United States intercontinental ballistic missile inventory.  Just before the wing was inactivated, the Air Force consolidated the group and the wing into a single unit.

History

World War II

Training in the United States
The unit was first activated on 26 January 1943 at Geiger Field Washington as the 390th Bombardment Group, with the 568th 569th 570th and 571st Bombardment Squadrons assigned as its original squadrons. The group did not begin to fill its ranks until early the following month.

The group trained at Geiger until June 1943 when it moved to Great Falls Army Air Base, Montana. Senior officers of the group were the first from bombardment groups to be assigned to Eighth Air Force to attend the Army Air Forces School of Applied Tactics at Orlando Army Air Base, Florida, where comprehensive training, based on the Army Air Forces' combat experience, was conducted. The 390th's Boeing B-17 Flying Fortresses began their flights overseas on 4 July, taking the northern ferry route from Iceland to Prestwick Airport, Scotland, where the first aircraft arrived on 13 July 1943. The ground echelon left for Camp Shanks, New York the same day and sailed on the SS James Parker on 17 July 1943, and arrived at Liverpool on 27 July. The group was reunited at its permanent station, RAF Framlingham, a few days later.

Combat in Europe

The group was the last of the "second wind" heavy bombardment groups that reinforced VIII Bomber Command in the summer of 1943 to arrive in England. It operated chiefly against strategic objectives. The 390th began combat on 12 August 1943. Only five days later, on 17 August, the group attacked the Messerschmitt aircraft complex at Regensburg, achieving the highest accuracy of any of the groups sent against the target.  Near the target area, the group was attacked by twin engine German fighters and suffered the heaviest losses of the three groups in the lead wing. This was a shuttle mission, with the bombers recovering at Twelfth Air Force bases in North Africa, although a group aircraft was one of the first two American planes to make emergency landings in neutral Switzerland. The group received a Distinguished Unit Citation for the mission.
The 390th was awarded a second Distinguished Unit Citation for a mission on 14 October 1943 when it braved assaults by enemy fighters to bomb the ball bearing plants at Schweinfurt. Once again, the group had the most accurate bombing results of the units attacking the target.  Allied intelligence estimated that following the attack German ball bearing production was reduced by 50% and that it was six months before production was restored to its level before the attack. The group participated in the intensive Allied attacks on the German aircraft industry during Big Week, from 20 to 25 February 1944, when it bombed aircraft factories, instrument plants and aircraft depots. Other strategic missions included attacks on marshalling yards at Frankfurt, bridges at Cologne, petroleum facilities at Zeitz, factories at Mannheim, naval installations at Bremen and synthetic oil refineries at Merseburg.

In January 1944 Sergeant Hewitt ‘Buck’ Dunn joined the 390th, who was a gunner and bombardier. He went on to become the only man in the Eighth Air Force to fly over 100 combat missions and one of the most decorated Enlisted men in the U.S. Air Force. He died in 1961 at the age of 41 and is buried at Arlington National Cemetery.

The group was sometimes diverted from the strategic mission to fly interdiction and ground support missions. On 25 May 1944, a detachment of the group was directed to bomb coastal defenses in France using radar, despite weather conditions that were ideal for visual bombing.  Although crewmembers were not advised why radar bombing was directed, this mission was a test to determine if pathfinder operations would succeed if the weather over Normandy was foul when the invasion took place. Thereafter, the group would frequently use pathfinder techniques when clouds obscured its assigned targets. The group bombed the coast near Caen fifteen minutes before the D-Day landings in Normandy on 6 June 1944.  It attacked enemy artillery in support of ground forces during Operation Cobra, the breakout at Saint-Lô in late July 1944.

In August 1944, the group attacked a Focke-Wulf aircraft factory at Rumia (Rahmel), Poland, landing at Mirgorod in the Ukraine.  After flying a mission against a synthetic oil production facility at Trzebinia, Poland, (returning to Mirgorod), the group attacked airfields in Romania, landing in Italy.  On its return to Feltwell, the group attacked a French airfield, suffering no losses to the three-legged mission. The 390th cut German supply lines during the Battle of the Bulge between December 1944 and January 1945. On 14 January 1945, during an attack on targets near Berlin, a low squadron of the group's aircraft were separated from the main attacking formation because of supercharger problems with the lead aircraft, making them easy targets for German fighters, which shot down all eight Flying Fortresses in the formation.  This was the highest loss the 390th suffered on a single mission during the war.

The group attacked airfields of the Luftwaffe to support Operation Varsity, the airborne assault across the Rhine, in March 1945. On 5 April 1945, Master Sergeant Hewitt Dunn became the only person to fly 100 combat missions with Eighth Air Force. The 390th Bombardment Group flew its last combat mission on 20 April 1945. In over 300 missions, they dropped more than 19,000 tons of bombs. They lost 176 aircraft and 714 airmen were killed in action.  The unit claimed the destruction of 342 enemy aircraft. The group dropped food supplies to the Dutch during the week prior to V-E Day.

The 390th redeployed to the States between June and August 1945. The group moved at minimum strength to Sioux Falls Army Air Field, South Dakota on 12 August and was inactivated there on 28 August 1945.

Cold War

In April 1960, the United States Air Force announced selection of the Davis–Monthan Air Force Base, Arizona to support an LGM-25C Titan II missile wing. The 1 January 1962 organization of the 390th Strategic Missile Wing marked the first stand up of a Titan II wing. Although the wing was built up from scratch some of its initial cadre came from the 303d Bombardment Wing, a Strategic Air Command (SAC) Boeing B-47 Stratojet wing, also stationed at Davis–Monthan. The wing's initial task was to supervise the construction of launch silos and command and control facilities for its Titans.

Its two component squadrons were the 570th and the 571st Strategic Missile Squadrons. Launcher locations for the 570th Squadron were at Oracle, Three Points, Rillito (4 silos), and Oracle Junction, Arizona (3 silos). The 571st's silos were located at Benson (2 silos), Mescal, Pantano, Continental (2 silos), Palo Alto, and Three Points, Arizona. On 31 March 1963, the contractor turned site 570-2 over to SAC for operational use.

Its first missile did not arrive at Davis–Monthan until 27 November 1962 and was installed in its silo twelve days later, although it would be 31 March 1963 before the wing would accept its first Titan II complex.  The 570th Squadron became operational on 13 June and the 571st on 30 November, when the 18th and final wing Titan II went on alert.  The 390th became the first operational Titan II wing in the Air Force the following day.

With a requirement to keep all 18 wing missiles on alert status, maintenance personnel initially worked extremely long hours, particularly until the end of 1964, when the Davis–Monthan launch sites became the first Titan II sites to install dehumidifier equipment that eased corrosion problems within the silos under Project Green Jug.  Additional modifications increased missile reliability, survivability, and reaction time. By the end of 1964, the 390th underwent the first operational readiness inspection for a Titan II unit. On 25 March 1965, the 390th performed the first operational launch test of one of its Titan IIs at Vandenberg Air Force Base, California in Operation Arctic Sun. More tests followed.

Competing in SAC's first missile competition, Project Curtain Raiser, in 1967, the 390th won the first "best crew" trophy. The wing was named the best Titan II wing in the Air Force at these competitions, which became known as "Olympic Arena." in 1969, 1970, 1974 and 1977. These awards were capped in 1979, when the wing was awarded the Blanchard Trophy as the best missile wing in SAC.

In October 1981, President Ronald Reagan announced that as part of the modernization of strategic missiles the Titan II was to be retired by 1 October 1987. Site deactivation began at Davis–Monthan on 1 October 1982. During the operation, titled Rivet Cap, missiles were removed and shipped to Norton Air Force Base, California, where they were refurbished and stored. Demolition began at missile complex 570-7 on 30 November 1983. In January 1984, the Air Force consolidated the 390th Group and the 390th Wing into a single unit. In May the last Titan II at Davis–Monthan came off alert status, and at the end of July the Air Force inactivated the 390th Strategic Missile Wing.

Lineage
 390th Bombardment Group
 Constituted as the 390th Bombardment Group (Heavy) on 15 January 1943
 Activated on 26 January 1943
 Redesignated 390th Bombardment Group, Heavy on 11 August 1944
 Inactivated on 28 August 1945
 Consolidated with the 390th Strategic Missile Wing as the 390th Strategic Missile Wing on 31 January 1984

 390th Strategic Missile Wing
 Established as the 390th Bombardment Wing, Medium on 23 March 1953
 Redesignated 390th Strategic Missile Wing and activated on 28 November 1961
 Organized on 1 January 1962
 Consolidated with the 390th Bombardment Group on 31 January 1984
 Inactivated on 31 July 1984

Assignments
 II Bomber Command, 26 January – 4 July 1943
 4th Bombardment Wing, July 1943 (attached to 402d Provisional Combat Bombardment Wing)
 13th Combat Bombardment Wing, 8 January 1944 – 4 August 1945
 Second Air Force, 12–28 August 1945
 Strategic Air Command, 28 November 1961
 12th Air Division (later 12th Strategic Aerospace Division, 12th Strategic Missile Division, 12th Air Division), 1 January 1962 – 31 July 1984

Components
 390th Missile Maintenance Squadron, 1 January 1962 – 31 July 1984
 568th Bombardment Squadron, 26 January 1943 – 28 August 1945
 569th Bombardment Squadron, 26 January 1943 – 28 August 1945
 570th Bombardment Squadron (later 570th Strategic Missile) Squadron), 26 January 1943 – 28 August 1945; 1 January 1962 – 31 July 1984
 571st Bombardment Squadron (later 570th Strategic Missile) Squadron), 26 January 1943 – 28 August 1945; 1 January 1962 – 2 December 1983

Stations
 Geiger Field, Washington, 26 January 1943 – 5 June 1943
 Great Falls Army Air Base, Montana, 6 June – 4 July 1943
 RAF Framlingham (Station 153), England, July 1943 – 4 August 1945
 Sioux Falls Army Air Field, South Dakota, 12 – 28 August 1945
 Davis–Monthan Air Force Base, Arizona, 1 January 1962 – 31 July 1984

Aircraft and missiles
 Boeing B-17 Flying Fortress, 1943–1945
 LGM-25C Titan II, 1962–1984

Awards and campaigns

 Blanchard Trophy, 1979

See also

 List of USAF Strategic Missile Wings assigned to Strategic Air Command
 List of inactive AFCON wings of the United States Air Force
 B-17 Flying Fortress units of the United States Army Air Forces
 List of 390th aircrew awarded the Distinguished Flying Cross

References

Notes

Citations

Bibliography

 
 
 
 
 
 
 

Further reading
 Anzanos, Andy. My Combat Diary With Eighth Air Force B-17s 390th Bomb Group. Lulu.com, 2006. .
 Drain, Richard E. 390th Bomb Group: History of the Aircraft Assigned. Self-published manuscript, 1993.
 Milliken, Albert E. (ed.) The Story of the 390th Bombardment Group (H): The Unit History of the Square J Group of the Eighth Air Force, European Theater of Operations, 1943–1945. New York: Eilert Printing Company, 1947.
 Perry, Richard H. (ed.) The 390th Bomb Group Anthology, Volume II. Tucson, Arizona: 390th Memorial Museum Foundation, 1985.
 Richarz, Wilbert H. with Richard H. Perry and William J. Robinson. The 390th Bomb Group Anthology. Tucson, Arizona: 390th Memorial Museum Foundation, 1983.
 Richarz, Wilbert H. with Richard H. Perry and William J. Robinson. The 390th Bomb Group Anthology, Volume II. Tucson, Arizona: 390th Memorial Museum Foundation, 1985.
 390th Bombardment Group: 50th Anniversary Commemorative History. Paducah, Kentucky: Turner Publishing Company, 1994. Republished 1997.

External links
 
 "390th Strategic Missile Wing Memorial Association" 390th SMW Memorial Association.
  (Many World War II and modern photographs with details of the restored control tower and museum.)
 

390
Military units and formations disestablished in 1984